Camillo Bonelli was Captain Regent of San Marino with Pietro Berti.

Camillo Bonelli and Pietro Berti, Captains Regent (1878–1879)

Captains Regent of San Marino
Members of the Grand and General Council